Metroland Media Group (also known as Community Brands) is a Canadian mass media publisher and distributor which primarily operates in Southern Ontario. A division of the publishing conglomerate Torstar Corporation, Metroland publishes more than 70 local community newspapers–including six dailies–and many magazines. Metroland has a substantial market presence in its geographic area, but has considerable competition from other large media and publishing organisations. In addition to printing most of its own publications, Metroland operates as a commercial printer of flyers and magazines.

History 
Metroland is the publisher of six daily and more than 70 community newspapers in Southern Ontario. Metroland also publishes local news, classified and shopping websites, and operates nine printing operations. The company is a distributor of flyers and circulars. It produces specialty print products, magazines and newspaper inserts, which are geared toward specific market segments. Metroland produces and manages a handful of consumer shows.

In February 1981, Metrospan Community Newspapers (a unit of Torstar) and Inland Publishing Company (formerly owned by The Telegram Corporation, owned by the Eaton and Bassett families) merged to become Metroland.

Metroland Publishing was combined with CityMedia Group to create Metroland Media Group on September 11, 2006. It is a wholly owned subsidiary of Torstar Corporation. In October 2011, it was announced that Metroland acquired Performance Printing of Smiths Falls, Ontario. The acquisition greatly expanded Metroland's community newspaper coverage in Eastern Ontario.

In 2013, the company cut the frequency of three Toronto suburban newspapers, Scarborough Mirror, North York Mirror and Etobicoke Guardian, from twice a week to once a week.

Business areas
Metroland's regional and specialized business units can be grouped into five categories: Newspapers, Printing, Distribution, Digital Media, and Consumer Marketing.

Distribution
Metroland maintains a distribution network separate from the Canada Post. The total number of pieces distributed annually has increased substantially to more than 4 billion in 2014. There are 20,000 delivery persons province-wide performing door-to-door delivery of flyers, papers and print materials.

Digital media
Metroland Media entered into digital media and the internet with the migration of their community newspaper sites online in the mid 1990s. Subsequently, Metroland has built or acquired numerous online properties including save.ca, a website offering coupons and flyers; and gottarent.com, a Canadian apartment rentals listing site.

Printing 
Metroland Media owns four printing plants in Ontario.  The presses print Metroland Media's newspapers but also provide commercial printing to other clients. The combined print capacity of these print facilities is reported as more than 16 million tabloid pages per hour in full colour, approximating 250,000 newspapers per hour.

Newspapers
Metroland publishes over 80 local and community newspapers.  Six of these are daily newspapers:

The remainder are weekly papers, including:

Magazines
Metroland publishes dozens of magazines and specialty product titles. The general areas of interest these magazines focus on include lifestyle, leisure, parenting and transportation themes.

Consumer marketing

Digital marketing production
Expansion into customer fulfilment led to creation of a Metroland Digital division in 2008 to provide SMBs (small-to-medium businesses) with full-service online marketing capabilities such as fully custom websites, e-commerce websites, paid search (like Google Adwords), search engine optimization (SEO) as well as social media marketing and display advertising.

Consumer shows
Metroland produces consumer shows in Toronto for specialty audiences for Metroland Media Group publications. Metroland produces several consumer shows and exhibitions including the Toronto Golf & Travel Show, the National Bridal Show, the Forever Young Lifestyle Show, the City Parent Family Show and numerous local area shows.

Competition
Other large media and publishing companies in the area are also engaged in convergence of their printing and digital activities, and constitute the primary market competition for Metroland in the region. Among these are Rogers Media, Transcontinental Media, and Quebecor.

Awards
Metroland Media publications have been recognized with Local Media Association awards such as (2013):
 Journalist of the Year – All Classes Combined
 Top Company Winners (92)
 Top Newspaper Winners (14)

References

External links 

Metroland Media Group corporate site
Torstar Corporation

Newspaper companies of Canada
Torstar
Companies based in Mississauga
Publishing companies established in 1981
1981 establishments in Ontario
Printing companies of Canada
Magazine publishing companies of Canada